A music roll is a storage medium used to operate a mechanical musical instrument. They are used for the player piano, mechanical organ, electronic carillon and various types of orchestrion. The vast majority of music rolls are made of paper. Other materials that have been utilized include thin card (Imhof-system), thin sheet brass (Telektra-system), composite multi-layered electro-conductive aluminium and paper roll (Triste-system) and, in the modern era, thin plastic or PET film.

The music data is stored by means of perforations.  The mechanism of the instrument reads these as the roll unwinds, using a pneumatic, mechanical or electrical sensing device called a tracker bar, and the mechanism subsequently plays the instrument.

After a roll is played, it is necessary for it to be rewound before it can be played again.  This necessitates a break in a musical performance.  To overcome this problem, some instruments were built with two player mechanisms (referred to as a duplex roll mechanism) allowing one roll to play while the other rewinds. 

A piano roll is a specific type of music roll, and is designed to operate an automatic piano like the player piano or the reproducing piano.

See also
Book music
Piano roll
Punched tape
Jacquard loom

References
 Barbara Bryner: The piano roll: a valuable recording medium of the twentieth century. Dept. of Music, University of Utah, 2002. 
 Karl Koenig Jazz in Print (1859-1929) Pendragon Press, 2002 pg. 180

Mechanical musical instruments